James Crombie (8 June 1834 - 17 September 1898) was a politician in colonial Queensland. He was a member of the Queensland Legislative Assembly from 1888 to 1898, representing the electorates of Mitchell (1888-1893) and Warrego (1893-1898).

References

Members of the Queensland Legislative Assembly
1834 births
1898 deaths
19th-century Australian politicians